Acacia Mate is a Mozambican sprinter. She competed in the women's 400 metres at the 1980 Summer Olympics. She was the first woman to represent Mozambique at the Olympics.

References

External links
 

Year of birth missing (living people)
Living people
Athletes (track and field) at the 1980 Summer Olympics
Mozambican female sprinters
Mozambican female middle-distance runners
Olympic athletes of Mozambique
Place of birth missing (living people)
Olympic female sprinters